The New Hampshire Wild are an independent American professional baseball team based in Concord, New Hampshire. They play in the Empire Professional Baseball League, which is not affiliated with Major League Baseball.

History 
The team was a member of the league during the inaugural 2016 season, playing at Franklin Pierce University in Rindge. After not participating in the 2017 season, on February 23, 2018, the league announced the revival of the New Hampshire Wild. Their new home field was announced as the Warren H. Doane Diamond at Concord's Memorial Field.

External links
 Official website

References

Professional baseball teams in New Hampshire
2016 establishments in New Hampshire
Baseball teams established in 2016
Concord, New Hampshire